Allen Foster (c. 1887 – 8 August 1916) was an English professional footballer who made over 140 appearances in the Southern League for Reading. An inside left, he also played in the Football League for Bristol City.

Career 
Foster was born in Rawmarsh, Yorkshire and began his career in non-League football with Parkgate Athletic and Rotherham Town. He moved to First Division club Bristol City in 1909, but made just 13 appearances, scoring one goal. Foster's prolific scoring for the Bristol City reserve team in the Great Western Suburban League prompted newly promoted Southern League First Division club Reading to sign him for a £75 fee in August 1911. A successful player with Reading, he was remembered for his hat-trick scored against Italian giants AC Milan in the Biscuitmen's 5–0 victory on 13 May 1914. The result prompted the leading Italian newspaper Corriere della Sera to report that "without doubt, Reading FC are the finest foreign team seen in Italy". Foster finished his professional career with Reading with 73 goals.

Personal life 
Foster was married and while a footballer with Parkgate Athletic, he worked in the fitter's room at a colliery. In 1914, during the early months of the First World War, Foster enlisted as a private in the Football Battalion of the Middlesex Regiment. On 8 August 1916, he went over the top with the battalion at Guillemont, during the Battle of Delville Wood and was shot in the thigh, abdomen and arm. Foster was recovered by four stretcher-bearers from no man's land and was transported to a hospital in Corbie, where he died of his wounds. He was buried in Corbie Communal Cemetery Extension.

Honours 
 Reading Hall of Fame

References

1880s births
1916 deaths
People from Rawmarsh
English footballers
Association football inside forwards
Rotherham Town F.C. (1899) players
Bristol City F.C. players
Reading F.C. players
English Football League players
Southern Football League players
British military personnel killed in the Battle of the Somme
Middlesex Regiment soldiers
Sportspeople from Yorkshire
Military personnel from Yorkshire
British Army personnel of World War I
Midland Football League players